The Ponkapoag Camp of Appalachian Mountain Club is a camp of the  Appalachian Mountain Club located on the eastern shore of Ponkapoag Pond in Randolph, Massachusetts. The camp consists of a collection of 20 cabins, dispersed across a wooded area, that typically sleep 4-6 people. No electricity or potable water is available at the camp; untreated water may be taken from the pond. In the summer the camp also makes available a few tent sites for camping. The camp was established in 1921.

Two of the camp's oldest surviving cabins were listed on the National Register of Historic Places in 1980.

See also
National Register of Historic Places listings in Norfolk County, Massachusetts

References

External links

Ponkapoag Camp web site

Park buildings and structures on the National Register of Historic Places in Massachusetts
Buildings and structures in Norfolk County, Massachusetts
Randolph, Massachusetts
National Register of Historic Places in Norfolk County, Massachusetts
Appalachian Mountain Club
Temporary populated places on the National Register of Historic Places